Abdirahman Abdi may refer to:

People
Abdirahman Abdi (Canadian) (died 2016), Somali–Canadian who died following an encounter with police
Abdirahman Abdi Mohamed, Deputy Minister of Foreign Affairs in Somalia
Abdirahman Abdi Osman (1965–2019), Minister of Commerce in Somalia

See also
Abdihakem Abdirahman (born 1977), Somali–American long-distance runner, nicknamed "Abdi"